Top Gear Overdrive is a racing game released in 1998 for the Nintendo 64 and the sequel to Top Gear Rally. The game has support for high-resolution graphics if used with the Expansion Pak and features music from the band Grindstone.

Gameplay

In the main mode of play, the player races through six seasons, each season containing more races from more tracks, with faster cars competing.

At the beginning of the race the player starts at the back of the grid at the start line. Computer players at the front of the grid often start one-third of the way around the first lap. Players start with three charges of nitrous oxide, which are used to give the player a temporary speed boost.

While racing, the player can pick up two power-ups: nitrous oxide and cash. The nitrous oxide can be used straight away, while the cash is added to the winnings at the end of the race and used for buying upgrades to the player's car.

Shortcuts are available on each track, and often the use of these decide the outcome of the races, particularly in later seasons.

At the end of each race the player is presented with a screen to allow for various upgrades to their car, such as to acceleration and handling. The player is also able to change their car for a better (or worse) vehicle and can buy extra nitrous oxide to use in the next race.

At the end of the season, if the player places fourth or better in all of that season's tracks, they are allowed to progress to the next season.

Tracks
In later seasons all of the above tracks, with the exception of "Space Truckin", are available mirrored and/or with a variety of weather conditions, such as snowing, thunder, and night time. As the player unlocks additional tracks, they will become available in all of the other game modes, except for "Space Truckin", which can only be played in the main championship mode.

Soundtrack
The majority of the music tracks were written and performed by Grindstone.

Reception

The game received "favorable" reviews according to the review aggregation website GameRankings.

References

External links

1998 video games
Kemco games
Nintendo 64 games
Nintendo 64-only games
Snowblind Studios games
Top Gear (video game series)
Video games developed in the United States